Deza may refer to:

People
 Alfredo Deza (high jumper) (born 1979), former Peruvian athlete specializing in the high jump
 Davis Deza (born 1991), Peruvian football midfielder
 Elena Deza (born 1961), French-Russian mathematician
 Diego Deza (1444–1523), inquisitor
 Jean Deza (born 1993), Peruvian footballer
 Michel Deza (1939–2016), Soviet and French mathematician
 Pedro de Deza (1520–1600), Spanish Roman Catholic cardinal and bishop

Places
 O Deza, a region in Spain
 Deza, Soria, a municipality in Soria Province, Spain
 Deza, Iran (disambiguation)

Other
 Swiss Agency for Development and Cooperation, agency in Switzerland, in German Direktion für Entwicklung und Zusammenarbeit (DEZA)